The 2020 Baylor Bears football team represented Baylor University in the 2020 NCAA Division I FBS football season. They played their home games at McLane Stadium in Waco, Texas, as a member of the Big 12 Conference and were led by first-year head coach Dave Aranda in the Bears' 122nd overall season.

Previous season
The Bears finished the 2019 season with an 11–3 record, 8–1 Big 12 play, losing the conference championship to Oklahoma and losing the Sugar Bowl to Georgia. On January 7, 2020, head coach Matt Rhule was hired as head coach of the Carolina Panthers. On January 20, Baylor announced the hire of LSU defensive coordinator Dave Aranda as head coach.

Offseason

Position key

Offseason departures
One Baylor player with remaining eligibility, James Lynch, declared early for the 2020 NFL Draft. In addition, 18 seniors from the 2019 team graduated.

Recruiting

2020 NFL Draft

NFL Combine

Team players drafted into the NFL

Preseason

Big 12 media poll
The Big 12 media days were held on July 21–22, 2020 in a virtual format due to the COVID-19 pandemic.

Schedule

Spring game
The Bears planned to hold spring practices in March and April 2020. The Baylor football spring "Green and Gold game" was to take place in Waco, TX on April 18, 2020. The team's spring practices as well as the spring game were canceled due to the COVID-19 pandemic.

Regular season
Baylor initially released its 2020 schedule on October 21, 2019. An updated Big 12 schedule was released on August 12, 2020 due to the COVID-19 pandemic. With the updated schedule, the Bears will host one non-conference games against Louisiana Tech. Baylor will host Kansas, Oklahoma State, TCU, and Kansas State and travel to West Virginia, Texas, Iowa State, Texas Tech, and Oklahoma in regular season conference play. On September 8, the Louisiana Tech game was postponed indefinitely. On September 12, a new game against Houston was announced in its place.  On September 18, Baylor announced that the Houston versus Baylor game would be postponed due to Baylor not meeting the Big 12 Conference COVID-19 game cancellation thresholds.

The Bears had games against Ole Miss and Incarnate Word, which were canceled due to the COVID-19 pandemic.

Schedule Source:

Coaching staff

Game summaries

vs. Kansas

at West Virginia

at Texas

vs. TCU

at Iowa State

at Texas Tech

vs. Kansas State

at Oklahoma

vs. Oklahoma State

Rankings

References

Baylor
Baylor Bears football seasons
Baylor Bears football